Broken Angel may refer to:

 Broken Angel (1988 film), a 1988 television film
 Broken Angel (2008 film), a 2008 film by Aclan Bates
 Broken Angel (2022 film), a 2022 film by Jules Arita Koostachin
 Broken Angel House, a house in Brooklyn, New York
 Broken Angel (song), a 2010 song by Arash